List of notable members of Sigma Phi Epsilon.

Academia

Arts, entertainment, and media

Business

Government and politics

Military

Religion and theology

Science and medicine

Sports

References 

Sigma Phi Epsilon
brothers